"Nightshift" is a 1985 song by the Commodores and the title track from their album of the same name. The song was written by lead singer Walter Orange in collaboration with Dennis Lambert and Franne Golde as a tribute to soul/R&B singers Jackie Wilson and Marvin Gaye, both of whom died in 1984. The song was released as the album's first single in January 1985 by Motown Records. "Nightshift" was recorded in 1984 and became the Commodores' first hit after Lionel Richie's departure from the group.

Background
The song features a lead vocal from drummer Walter Orange, who had sung lead years earlier on "Brick House". Lionel Richie's replacement, J.D. Nicholas, sings the second verse and then Orange and Nicholas share lead vocals on the remaining choruses.

The first verse mentions Gaye's song "What's Going On", while the second verse mentions Jackie Wilson's "Lonely Teardrops" ("Say you will"), "Baby Workout" and "(Your Love Has Lifted Me) Higher and Higher".

Release and reception
"Nightshift" became their biggest hit after Richie's departure, peaking at number three for the week of April 20 on both the Billboard Hot 100 and UK Singles Chart, and rising to number one on the Hot Black Singles chart; the single also became a success on the Adult Contemporary and the Hot Dance Music/Maxi-Singles Sales charts in the first half of that year.  As of 2021, it was the group's final top ten hit.

Although the band was against the label decision to release it as a single, it won a Grammy Award in 1985 for Best Vocal R&B Performance by a Duo/Group.

Chart performance

Weekly charts

Year-end charts

Bruce Springsteen version
Bruce Springsteen recorded a version of the song for his 2022 album, Only the Strong Survive. The song was released as a single and music video in October 2022.

References

External links
 Song Facts
2010 Re-recording dedicated to Michael Jackson

1985 singles
Commodores songs
Dutch Top 40 number-one singles
1985 songs
1980s ballads
Songs about Marvin Gaye
Commemoration songs
Songs written by Franne Golde
Songs written by Dennis Lambert
Soul ballads